John Mein may refer to:

 John Gordon Mein, U.S. ambassador
 John Mein (publisher)